Florida's 7th House District elects one member of the Florida House of Representatives. The district is represented by Jason Shoaf. The district is located in the Florida Panhandle, and encompasses the Forgotten Coast, as well as part of the Nature Coast and the Big Bend. The district covers all of Calhoun County, Gulf County, Liberty County, Franklin County, Wakulla County, Jefferson County, Madison County, Taylor County, and Lafayette County, as well as the western half of Leon County. The largest city in the district is Perry. As of the 2010 Census, the district's population is 156,188.

This district covers most of the rural eastern Panhandle, and as a result it has skewed heavily Republican, with Shoaf winning his 2019 special election with over 71% of the vote.

There was a vacancy between March 25, 2005 and June 14, 2005 due to the death of the incumbent, David Coley. His wife and Chipola College professor Marti Coley won the special election to fill the seat.

There was a vacancy between January 11, 2019 and June 18, 2019 when the incumbent, Halsey Beshears, was appointed by Governor Ron DeSantis as the secretary of the Florida Department of Business and Professional Regulation. Businessman Jason Shoaf won the special election to fill the seat.

Representatives from 1967 to the present

See also 

 Florida's 3rd Senate district
 Florida's 5th Senate district
 Florida's 2nd congressional district
 Florida's 5th congressional district

References 

07
Calhoun County, Florida
Gulf County, Florida
Liberty County, Florida
Franklin County, Florida
Wakulla County, Florida
Jefferson County, Florida
Madison County, Florida
Taylor County, Florida
Lafayette County, Florida
Leon County, Florida